Moolaipozhi is a coastal village in the Tuticorin district in Tamil Nadu State, India.

Notable personalities
 Shiv Nadar the founder and chairman of HCL and the Shiv Nadar Foundation was born in this village.

References 

Villages in Thoothukudi district